Ciro may refer to:

Ciro (given name), a list of the people who share the Italian and Spanish given name
Ćiro (given name), a list of the people who share the Croatian given name
Ciro (opera), 1654 opera by Francesco Cavalli
Cyrus Cuneo (1879-1916), Italian American artist who was generally known as Ciro

See also
Cirò (disambiguation)
Ciro's, nightclub